Joseph Russell Cotton (November 16, 1890 – October 28, 1983) was an American jurist and politician who served as a judge of the Massachusetts Land Court and President of the Massachusetts Senate.

Early life
Cotton was born on November 16, 1890 in Charlestown. His father, Henry Ward Beecher Cotton, was an attorney and a member of the Boston Common Council from 1880 to 1881. Cotton's family moved to Lexington, Massachusetts when he was three years old. He attended Lexington public schools, Roxbury Latin School, and graduated from the Boston University School of Law in 1912. He practiced law for many years with his father. During World War I, Cotton served in the United States Army at Camps Devens and Grant, but was never sent oversees. He was mustered out of the Army following the Armistice of November 11, 1918 and later served as the first commander of Lexington's American Legion post.

Political career
In 1919, Cotton was elected town moderator of Lexington. Two years later he was elected to the town's board of selectmen. In 1923 he was elected to the Massachusetts House of Representatives and in 1927 he was elected to the Massachusetts Senate in the 7th Middlesex District. In 1928 he faced a tough primary fight against Alice F. D. Pearson, the wife of former Senator Gardner Pearson. Cotton won 6,115 votes to 4,576. He was never challenged for the Republican nomination again. In 1938, Senate President Samuel H. Wragg was elected Sheriff of Norfolk County, Massachusetts and Cotton was chosen to succeed him little opposition. In December 1939, Cotton was appointed to the additional position of chairman of the state Public Utilities Commission. Cotton did not run for reelection in 1940 and instead was named secretary to Massachusetts Governor Leverett Saltonstall.

Judicial career
In 1943, Cotton was appointed as an associate judge of the Massachusetts Land Court. He remained on the court until his retirement in 1965. Cotton died on October 28, 1983 following a long illness.

See also
 Massachusetts legislature: 1923–1924, 1927–1928, 1929–1930, 1931–1932, 1933–1934, 1935–1936, 1937–1938, 1939

References

1890 births
1983 deaths
Boston University School of Law alumni
Massachusetts lawyers
Republican Party Massachusetts state senators
People from Charlestown, Boston
People from Lexington, Massachusetts
Presidents of the Massachusetts Senate
20th-century American politicians
20th-century American lawyers